Eugeniusz Frankowski (1884–1962) was a Polish archaeologist, ethnographer and ethnologist.

1884 births
1962 deaths
People from Siedlce
People from Siedlce Governorate
Members of the Lwów Scientific Society
20th-century Polish archaeologists
Polish ethnographers
Polish ethnologists
Academic staff of Adam Mickiewicz University in Poznań
Knights of the Order of Saint James of the Sword